The Alexander von Humboldt Foundation of Germany bestows the Sofia Kovalevskaya Award every two years.  Sofia Kovalevskaya (1850–1891) was the first major Russian female mathematician, who made important contributions to mathematical analysis, differential equations and mechanics, and the first woman appointed to a full professorship in Northern Europe. This prestigious award named in her honor is given to promising young academics to pursue their line of research in the sciences or arts and humanities. The foundation encourages applications from all areas of the academy so long as the investigator received a Ph.D. in the last six years and may be categorized as "top flight" by their publications and experience as commensurate with age.

There have been 59 awards since the inception of the Sofia Kovalevskaya Award in 2002. Individual awards may total up to 1.6 million Euro each. Funds are awarded to build and lead a team of researchers for a five-year period within a German host institution.

Award winners

References

External links
 

German awards
Science and technology awards